Hugh Boscawen may refer to:

 Hugh Boscawen (1625–1701), British politician
 Hugh Boscawen, 1st Viscount Falmouth (c. 1680–1734), British Whig politician
 Hugh Boscawen, 2nd Viscount Falmouth (1707–1782), British soldier and politician
 Hugh Boscawen (died 1795), British politician